The Mingin, also known as the Mingginda, are an Aboriginal Australian people of the state of Queensland, who lived in the Gulf Country east of Moonlight Creek and the Yukulta / Ganggalidda people in the southern Gulf of Carpentaria.

Language
The Mingin language's affiliation has yet to be determined but is thought to have belonged to the Tangkic language family, and to have been closely related to the languages of the Wellesley Islands and in particular Yukulta spoken by the neighbouring Ganggalida.

Country
Their southern limits lay around Augustus Downs and Gregory Downs. Their sole contact with the coast was at the area where the Albert River drains into the Gulf of Carpentaria.

Social customs
The Mingin were a circumcising tribe which dropped the rite from their initiation ceremonies sometime around the middle of the 129th century. They had close links, though speaking apparently quite distinct languages, with the neighbouring Maikudunu. According to one early settler in their area, their tribal traditions held that they were respectively formed by branching off from the Kalkatungu, a people whom they, and the Maikudunu, thereafter reportedly held in contempt.

History
The Mingin lived along the coastal territory lying west of the Leichhardt River. One oral account, conserved by the Ganggalida, has them encountering intruders in the area of the Albert River. The Leichhardt river forms a natural divide between differing aboriginal cultures, circumcision not being practiced east of it, from which one may infer that the Mingginda included it in their initiatory rituals.

Within a very short period after the beginning of white settlement in the area, the Mingin were decimated, either through white colonial violence, introduced diseases, or both. The yellow fever that ravaged the settlement of Burketown, which was founded in the heartland of their territory, is thought to have been a major factor precipitating their disappearance, and by the 1930s they were thought of as extinct. The Ganggalida people spread to occupy the niche once occupied by the Mingin, and have successfully petitioned for a native title right to the latter tribe's traditional lands around Burketown on the basis of the principle of succession.

Alternative names
 Mingir. (misprint)
 Minikin
 Minkin
 Myngeen

Source:

Words

Animals 
 jaco-jaco. (kangaroo)
 kallanarra. (mosquito)
 karimbala. (white cockatoo)
 koodoo. (tame dog)
 koorina. (fly)
 megilpurra. (wild dog)
 ooabiba. (egg)
 paganbaba. (snake)
 piringooraa. (wild turkey)
 piteldoo. (pelican)
 poolunganna. (emu)
 pooralga. (native companion)
 wapoora. (possum)
 wongoola. (crow)
 worra. (fish)

Body Parts 

bilba. (thigh)
boormba. (hair of the head)
changa. (foot)
charn-nga. (tongue)
dimira. (bone)
kiwira. (nose)
lia. (teeth)
makola. (breasts)
mara. (ear)
 migilla. (eye)
 na-nga-ra. (hand)
 pagooroo. (skin)
 paranga. (fat)
 pardaga. (stomach)
 parka. (mouth)
 tangana. (blood)
 turra. (bowel and excrement)
 wedda. (head)
 yarin-nga. (beard)

Numbers 

 choarng-ngo. (one)
 tigina. (two)
 tarngiltna. (three)

People 

birgenkoora. (brother-younger)
churbooyo. (God)
kiagi. (father)
koo-ar-ee. (being who taught them everything)
 koondoonoo. (mother)
 magoo. (black woman)
 nacile. (brother-elder)
 nurka. (aboriginal man)
 ooardigiri. (old woman)
 ooroonda. (a young man)
 parda. (ghosts)
 pardingara. (an old man)
 pelgincorra. (a baby)
 takandana. (a white man)
 tano ara mingoo? (where are black?)
 tyana. (track of a foot)
 wompoora. (the blacks)
 yillolunga. (sister-elder)

Source:

Notes

Citations

Sources

Aboriginal peoples of Queensland